The 1926 Queensland state election was held on 8 May 1926.

Since the previous election, the United and Country parties had merged to form the Country and Progressive National Party. Seats held by either predecessor are listed as held by the CPNP.

By-elections

 On 13 October 1923, Randolph Bedford (Labor) was elected to succeed Harry Coyne (Labor), who had resigned on 31 July 1923, as the member for Warrego.
 On 16 August 1924, Ted Hanson (Labor) was elected to succeed John Huxham (Labor), who had resigned on 31 July 1924, as the member for Buranda.
 On 4 April 1925, Evan Llewelyn (Labor) was elected to succeed Frank Brennan (Labor), who had resigned on 26 February 1925, as the member for Toowoomba.
 On 16 January 1926, John O'Keefe (Labor) was elected to succeed Ted Theodore (Labor), who had resigned on 22 September 1925, as the member for Chillagoe.
 On 16 January 1926, Cornelius Ryan (Labor) was elected to succeed William Gillies (Labor), who had resigned on 24 October 1925, as the member for Eacham.

Retiring Members

Labor
John Gilday MLA (Ithaca)

CPNP
Andrew Petrie MLA (Toombul)

Candidates
Sitting members at the time of the election are shown in bold text.

See also
 1926 Queensland state election
 Members of the Queensland Legislative Assembly, 1923–1926
 Members of the Queensland Legislative Assembly, 1926–1929
 List of political parties in Australia

References
 

Candidates for Queensland state elections